Streptomyces hyaluromycini is a Gram-positive bacterium species from the genus of Streptomyces which has been isolated from the tunicate Molgula manhattensis from the Tokyo Bay on Japan.

See also 
 List of Streptomyces species

References 

 

hyaluromycini
Bacteria described in 2016